The 1935 Western State Teachers Hilltoppers football team represented Western State Teachers College (later renamed Western Michigan University) as an independent during the 1935 college football season.  In their seventh season under head coach Mike Gary, the Hilltoppers compiled a 5–3 record and were outscored by their opponents, 91 to 78. Guard Frank Secory and quarterback Harold Reynolds were the team captains.

Schedule

References

Western State Teachers
Western Michigan Broncos football seasons
Western State Teachers Hilltoppers football